Rulon Timpson Jeffs (December 6, 1909 – September 8, 2002), known to followers as Uncle Rulon, was an American polygamist and religious leader who served as the president of the Fundamentalist Church of Jesus Christ of Latter-Day Saints (FLDS Church), a Mormon fundamentalist organization based in Colorado City, Arizona, United States from 1986 until his death in 2002. He was the father of later FLDS Church leader and convicted felon Warren Jeffs.

Biography
Rulon Jeffs was born in Salt Lake City, Utah on December 6, 1909, the son of first generation Mormon fundamentalist David William Ward Jeffs, the son of William Yemm Jeffs of Brierley Hill, England; and David Jeffs' plural wife, Nettie Lenora Timpson. The elder Jeffs lived his polygamous lifestyle in secret, and Rulon spent the first ten years of his life under the pseudonym Rulon Jennings. Jeffs was raised a member of the Church of Jesus Christ of Latter-day Saints (LDS Church), and served in the British mission from June 1930 to August 1932.

Jeffs' father did not introduce him to the teachings of Mormon fundamentalism until September 25, 1938, at the elder Jeffs' birthday dinner, where he presented his son with a copy of Joseph W. Musser's Truth magazine. Jeffs embraced the fundamentalist message after meeting Musser and John Y. Barlow. In 1940, he secretly took a plural wife, for which his first wife, Zola Brown, daughter of LDS Church apostle Hugh B. Brown; and great-granddaughter of Brigham Young, divorced him. 

In the spring of 1945, Jeffs, who had been working in northern Idaho since 1943, returned to Salt Lake City, where he was ordained a high priest apostle by Barlow on April 19. Jeffs was a protege of both Barlow and later Priesthood Council senior Leroy S. Johnson, who compared their relationship to that of Brigham Young and Heber C. Kimball. Jeffs assumed the leadership of the group after Johnson's death in 1986.

It was reported that at the time of Jeffs's death at age 92 that he had had 65 wives and 65 children; other sources indicate that he may have been survived by 60 wives and "about 60 children," including 33 sons. According to author Jon Krakauer, who chronicles the FLDS Church and the Jeffs family in Under the Banner of Heaven, several of Jeffs's wives were underage: as young as 14 at the time they were married to him. Shortly after his death, one of Jeffs's sons, Warren Jeffs, asserted his own leadership of the FLDS Church and subsequently married all but two of his father's widows, solidifying his political position in the community.

Works

See also
 List of Mormon fundamentalist leaders

References

External links
 

1909 births
2002 deaths
American Latter Day Saint leaders
American Latter Day Saints
American people of English descent
Fundamentalist Church of Jesus Christ of Latter-Day Saints members
Mormon fundamentalist leaders
People from Short Creek Community
Prophets in Mormonism
Religious leaders from Arizona
Religious leaders from Utah